The  is a currently active Japanese political party established in 1996.

Social Democratic Party (Japan) may also refer to:

Historical political parties 
 , also referred to as the 'Social Democratic Party of Japan', a major Japanese political party that existed from 1945 to 1996
 , a political party that existed from 1926 to 1932
 , a political party that existed briefly in 1901

See also 
 Japan Socialist Party (disambiguation), a disambiguation page for Japanese socialist parties
 List of social democratic parties